Kököchin, also Kökejin, Kūkājīn, Cocacin or Cozotine (Mn: ,), was a 13th-century princess of the Mongol-led Chinese Yuan dynasty, belonging to the Mongol Bayaut tribe. In 1291, she was betrothed to the Ilkhanate khan Arghun by the Yuan founding emperor Kublai, but married his son Ghazan when Arghun died by the time she had arrived in Persia in 1293. The account of Kököchin's journey to Persia was given by Marco Polo.

Name 
Note that among the various English translations of Polo's book, there are at least ten spellings for her name.  Absent various accented characters here, the names include Cocachin, Cocacin, Cozotine, Kogatin, Kokachin, Kokechin, Kokejin, Kokochin, Kukachin, and Kukajin.

"Kökö" may mean "blue" (especially "sky blue", cf. *kȫk) or "dark" as in complexion, and "chin" or "jin" a suffix used for the name of a person. The name "Kököchin" may therefore be translated as "The Dark Complected".

The name could also be a corruption of kȫkerčin, which means dove or pigeon.

Background
Following the loss of Arghun's favourite wife Bolgana ("Zibeline"), Arghun sent a request to his grand-uncle Kublai Khan to send him a relative of his dead wife, saying that only one of her kinswomen should succeed her. Kublai chose the 17-year-old Kököchin. 

Kublai, from his capital of Khanbaliq (the Khan's city, modern day Beijing) entrusted Marco Polo with his last duty, to escort princess Kökechin to Arghun along with three envoys, Oulatai, Apusca, and Coja. The party travelled by sea, departing from the southern port city of Quanzhou in the spring of 1291. There were 14 big ships in all, and each had 4 masts and 12 sails. They set out from Quanzhou, sailing to Sumatra where they were delayed for five months due to weather, and then to Persia, via Sri Lanka and India (where his visits included Mylapore, Madurai, and Alleppey, which he nicknamed Venice of the East). They arrived around 1293.

Arghun had died in the meantime however, and Kököchin married Arghun's son Ghazan and became his principal wife. She died in June 1296.

Accounts
There are three sources for the account of the mission to Persia  – a passage in the Chinese work Yongle Encyclopedia (which however does not mention the princess), the Persian Jami' al-tawarikh written by Rashid-al-Din Hamadani, with the most detailed description given by Marco Polo:

The account of the marriage was confirmed by the Persian historian Rashid-al-Din Hamadani in his Jami' al-tawarikh where she was named Kūkājīn.

Notes

13th-century Mongolian women
Princesses
Women of the Mongol Empire
1296 deaths